Contao (formerly TYPOlight) is a free content management system (CMS) for medium to large websites. The program specializes in back-office (i.e. for developers) and front-office (i.e., for users) accessibility, and observes XHTML, HTML5 and CSS standards, according to W3C/WAI guidelines, to generate pages. The program is an open-source project, published in its original form in 2006 by Leo Feyer.

Minimal/suggested installations
As of 4.4, Contao requires an Apache, Nginx or IIS web server, PHP (version 5.6.0 or greater), the MySQL or MariaDB relational database management system (version 5.1 or greater) and the PHP extension GDLib (to allow image resizing) and SOAP (access to the extension repository).  Contao runs successfully with current versions of major browsers like Firefox, Chrome and Internet Explorer (from version 8 on).

Product name
As of the pre-release version 2.9. RC1 on June 6, 2010, the TYPOlight product was renamed Contao. Developer Leo Feyer justified the change on the grounds that TYPOlight had often been confused with TYPO3, a different CMS originally developed by Kasper Skårhøj, whilst the word “light” was sometimes misunderstood to imply that the CMS was suitable only for small projects.

In his instructional book (not freely available) on the CMS, Websites erstellen mit Contao, Peter Müller writes that the software name “Contao” has “a good ring”, pointing out that C, O, N are the first letters of “content” and that tạo is a Vietnamese word that means “to model, generate or shape.” The name is appropriate, he suggests, because the program “allows content to be generated, shaped and managed.”

Reviews, awards and critiques
In 2007 Packt Publishing named TYPOlight, as it was then known, as the second-place winner in its awards category of “Most Promising Open-Source CMS”.

Versions

Learning Contao

Instructional books
The following books on Contao are available (in German only). 
 Leo Feyer: Das offizielle Contao-Handbuch: Der Leitfaden für Anwender, Administratoren und Entwicklung (Official Contao manual: Guide for users, administrators and developers). Addison-Wesley, Munich 2010. 
 Thomas Weitzel: Mit Contao Webseiten erfolgreich gestalten: Konzeption, Umsetzung, Beispielprojekte (Successful Contao websites: design, implementation, sample projects). Addison-Wesley, Munich 2010, 264 pages. 
 Nina Gerling: Contao für Redakteure: Inhalte editieren und verwalten mit dem Open-Source-CMS (Contao for editors: Edit and manage content using the open source CMS). Addison-Wesley, Munich 2010.  Online Handbuch
 Anne-Kathrin Merz: Contao: Das umfassende Praxisbuch (Contao: The comprehensive practice book). Addison-Wesley, 2010. 
 Peter Müller: Websites erstellen mit Contao (Create websites with Contao). Galileo Computing, 2010, 536 pages. , third edition (2012), 
 Thomas Reindlmeier: Contao: Webseiten clever gestalten (Contao: cleverly designed websites). KnowWare, Osnabrück, 2010,

References

External links
 

Free content management systems
Web applications
Free software programmed in PHP